Three Chain Road is the second studio album by Australian musical artist, Lee Kernaghan. It was released in August 1993 and peaked at number 35 in February 1994.

The album won the ARIA Award for Best Country Album at the ARIA Music Awards of 1994. It was certified double platinum in 1998.

Track listing
 "The Outback Club" – 3:23
 "Three Chain Road" – 4:14
 "She's My Ute" – 3:42
 "Dust on My Boots" – 3:40
 "The Burning Heart" – 4:03
 "'Cause I'm Country" – 4:14
 "Collingullie Station" – 3:46
 "Leave Him in the Longyard" – 3:16
 "Southern Son" – 4:01
 "Back to the Shack" – 3:39
 "Cobar Line" – 2:47
 "Western Stars" – 3:12

Personnel
Lee Kernaghan - vocals
Additional musicians
Mark Meyer - drums
James Gillard - bass, backing vocals
Ian Lees - bass
Jeff McCormack - bass
Mark Punch - electric guitar, backing vocals
Rod McCormack - acoustic guitar, mandolin banjo, electric guitar, backing vocals
Colin Watson - electric guitar, acoustic guitar
Lawrie Minson - electric slide guitar, dobro, harmonica, piano accordion
Mick Albeck - fiddle
Michel Rose - pedal steel guitar
Garth Porter - keyboard

Charts

Certifications

References

1993 albums
ARIA Award-winning albums
Lee Kernaghan albums